"All the Money's Gone" is a song by Babylon Zoo and the first single to be taken from their second album King Kong Groover. It was written and produced by Jas Mann, and peaked at #46 on the UK Singles Chart in February 1999. An animated music video was made to accompany the single.

Reception
The Sunday Mercury read: "Mann is having an identity crisis... he can't decide if he's [David] Bowie, Marc Bolan or Gary Glitter – but glam-rock, this disappointing record ain't". Ewan MacLeod of the Sunday Mail enjoyed the single's accompanying music video, but felt it "a shame the song sounds like a rip-off of Seventies glam group T-Rex". In NME, Steven Wells wrote that the "very Bowie-esque" track "sucks" on an unrivalled level. Anna Carey of the Sunday Tribune called it "hideous".

In a retrospective article for AllMusic, critic Dave Thompson likened the song to "an unholy collision between Oasis and Barry Blue's 'Dancing on a Saturday Night'."

Track listing
CD Promo Single 1998 EMI (CDEMDJ 519)
All the Money's Gone (7" Mix) - 3.44

CD Single 1 1998 EMI (CDEMS 519)
All the Money's Gone - 3.44
Chrome Invader - 5.03
All the Money's Gone (Wiseass Dawn Patrol Remix) - 6.53

CD Single 2 1998 EMI (CDEM 519)
All the Money's Gone - 3.44
All the Money's Gone (Tin Tin Out Vocal Mix) - 8.35
All the Money's Gone (Space Raiders Mix) - 6.08

References

1999 singles
Babylon Zoo songs
1998 songs
EMI Records singles
Song recordings produced by Steve Power